Technika is a university press department of Vilnius Gediminas Technical University (VGTU), Lithuania.

The publishing house was established in 1967 for publishing scholarly literature. Among the scientific publications there are internationally well-known research journals concerning different fields of science: technological sciences (10 journals), social sciences (4 journals) and humanities (3 journals). Both Lithuanian and foreign scientists publish their research papers in VGTU journals. All the research journals published by VGTU are abstracted by international databases of scientific information. Seven of them are referred by Thomson Reuters (ISI Web of Science).

In 2008 Technika published over 277 issues of scientific books, including textbooks and educational books, etc. All publications of Technika are peer reviewed and edited.

References

External links
VGTU Publishing House "Technika"
Research journals published by VGTU Press
Vilnius Gediminas Technical University ebooks

University presses of Lithuania
Vilnius Gediminas Technical University
Book publishing companies of Lithuania
Publishing companies established in 1967
Academic publishing companies
1967 establishments in the Soviet Union
Publishing companies of the Soviet Union